Clever Bins Limited was a UK company that provided solar-powered street litter bins that displayed digital outdoor advertising.

Description
The Clever Bins came with A2 paper sized display panels, lit up by directional LED beams. These used military standard Riot shielding. Some models streamed messages to nearby mobile devices. They were solar-powered, with a maximum seven hours of light per charge, automatically adjusting brightness to suit the power level.

Funding

In August 2009, Sachiti failed to find an investor on the BBCs TV show Dragons' Den.

Clever Bins was partnered with Keep Britain Tidy in July 2010. on a study for which Keep Britain tidy will release the results later in 2011.

Locations 
Clever Bins had a trial with the London Borough of Hammersmith & Fulham.

Clever Bins could also be found outside near London's tube stations, Lakeside Shopping Centre, Manchester, Birmingham City, Tower Bridge London, and locations in Singapore, Hong Kong, Maldives and Italy.

References

External links
Official Website (Archived)

Recycling
Street furniture
Waste containers
2009 establishments in England